A tracer-gas leak testing method is a nondestructive testing method that detects gas leaks. A variety of methods with different sensitivities exist. Tracer-gas leak testing is used in the petrochemical industry, the automotive industry, and in the manufacture of semiconductors, among other uses.

Types
Several tracer-gas leak testing methods exist, including:
 Detection of leaks using helium mass spectrometer, which provides high sensitivity
 Hydrogen leak testing, which provides the best mobility
 Refrigerant gas leak detection, for refrigeration applications

Method selection

Typical leakage rates 
The nature of the product or the process and the process gases will set the leak rate requirement:

Sensitivity of methods 
Based on the target leak rate, the table below will help to choose the most suitable method.

Applications 
Typical applications of tracer-gas leak testing include:
 In petrochemical plants, hydrocracking, vapocracking, catalytic reforming, and steam reforming are all hydrogen-based processes, in which were hydrogen leak testing is required.
 When manufacturing semiconductors, all processes taking place in a process chamber at atmospheric pressure or under vacuum – diffusion, oxidation, LPCVD, PECVD, PVD and ion implantation – require helium or hydrogen leak testing.
 In vehicles, airbags have to be tested for leaks so they remain functional for a long time. As well as airbags, the air conditioning system, fuel system, and exhaust system require testing for leaks.
 Pacemakers and catheters have to be tested for efficacy and longevity.
 On planes, tracer-gas leak testing is used to quickly and safely locate fuel leaks, as well as to check oxygen distribution devices and cabin pressurization systems.
 Refrigeration and air conditioning must have the lowest possible rate of loss of refrigerant gases (contributing to ozone depletion).
 Sewage and drinking water networks, to reduce loss of water and make sure drinking water is not contaminated by sewage.

Standards

Several standards apply to leak testing and more specifically to tracer-gas leak testing methods, for example:
 BS EN 1779:1999; leak tightness by indication or measurement of gas leakage,
 BS EN 13185:2001 Non-destructive testing. Leak testing. Tracer gas method,
 BS EN 13192:2002 Non-destructive testing. Leak testing. Calibration of reference leaks for gases.

References

Tests
Nondestructive testing
Hydrogen technologies